The following outline is provided as an overview of and topical guide to hydrology:

Hydrology – study of the movement, distribution, and quality of water on Earth and other planets, including the hydrologic cycle, water resources and environmental watershed sustainability.

What type of thing is hydrology? 

Hydrology can be described as all of the following:

 a branch of science
 a branch of natural science
 a branch of physical science
 a branch of Earth science
 a branch of geography
 a branch of physical geography

Essence of hydrology 

Water
Hydrologic cycle
Cryosphere
Origin of water on Earth
Water distribution on Earth

Branches of hydrology 

 Hydrometry – the measurement of the different components of the hydrologic cycle
 Chemical hydrology – the study of the chemical characteristics of water
 Ecohydrology – the study of interactions between organisms and the hydrologic cycle
 Hydrogeology – the study of the presence and movement of water in aquifers
 Hydroinformatics – the adaptation of information technology to hydrology and water resources applications
 Hydrometeorology – the study of the transfer of water and energy between land and water body surfaces and the lower atmosphere
 Isotope hydrology – the study of the isotopic signatures of water
 Surface hydrology – the study of hydrologic processes that operate at or near the Earth's surface
 Catchment hydrology – study of the governing processes in a given hydrologically-defined catchment
 Drainage basin management – covers water-storage, in the form of reservoirs, and flood-protection.
 Water quality – includes the chemistry of water in rivers and lakes, both of pollutants and natural solutes.

History of hydrology 

History of hydrology

Things studied by hydrology

Abstract concepts in hydrology 

 Field capacity

Phenomena studied by hydrology

Water movement pathways 

Water cycle (aka "hydrological cycle")
 Above ground
 Evaporation –
 Pan evaporation –
 Condensation – 
 Precipitation – condensed water, is pulled by gravity back to Earth, in the form of:
 Drizzle
 Rain
 Sleet
 Snow
 Graupel
 Hail
 Interception –
 Evapotranspiration –
 Stemflow –
 Throughfall –
On ground
 Surface runoff – flow of surface water
 First flush
 Floods
 Flash floods
 Overland flow –
 Horton overland flow –
Below ground
 Infiltration –
 Pipeflow –
 Baseflow –
 Subsurface flow – flow of ground water

Physical things studied by hydrology 

 Ground water
 Soil moisture
 Surface water

Environmental issues 
 Desertification/Oasification –
 Hypoxia –
 Erosion –
 Water pollution –

Measurement tools

Groundwater
 Aquifer characterization
 Flow direction
 Piezometer - groundwater pressure and, by inference, groundwater depth (see: aquifer test)
 Conductivity, storativity, transmisivity
 Geophysical methods

Vadose zone characterization
Infiltration
 Infiltrometer - infiltration
Soil moisture
 Capacitance probe-soil moisture
 Time domain reflectometer - soil moisture
 Tensiometer - soil moisture
 Solute sampling
 Geophysical methods

Surface water
 Water level
 Mechanical pressure gauge –
 Electronic pressure gauge –
 Acoustic pressure gauge –
 Channel shape
 Dumpy level –
 Discharge
 Acoustic Doppler velocimeter –
 Dilution tracing –

Meteorological 
 Precipitation
 Rain gauge – rainfall depth (unit) and intensity (unit time−1)
 Disdrometer – raindrop size, total precipitation depth and intensity
 Doppler weather radar – raindrop size, total precipitation depth and intensity, rain cloud reflectivity converted to precipitation intensity through calibration to rain gauges
 Wind profiler – precipitation vertical and horizontal motion, vertical cross-section of reflectivity and typing
 Frozen precipitation (on ground)
 Pressure sensors – pressure, depth, and liquid water equivalent
 Acoustic sensors –  pressure, depth, and liquid water equivalent
 Mean windspeed and direction
 Anemometer –
 Doppler sonar –
 Wind profiler – air vertical and horizontal motion
 Mean air temperature
 Thermometer –
 Humidity
 Infrared thermometer – a form of remote sensing
 Hygrometer (Psychrometer) – measures relative humidity
 Air pressure
 Barometer –
 Heat flux
 Net radiometer –
 Pyranometer –
 Pyrgeometer –
 Heat flux sensor –
 Lysimeter –
 Cloudiness/Sunshine
 Spectroradiometer –
 Campbell–Stokes recorder –
 Evapotranspiration 
 Water budget method
 Basin water balance –
 Evaporation pan –
 Lysimetry –
 Soil moisture depletion –
 Water vapor transfer method
 Bowen ratio – considers the energy budget
 Eddy covariance –
 Component analysis
 Porometry/Sap flow –
 Interception loss –
 Soil evaporation –
 Large-scale
 Scintillometer  –
 Remote sensing estimates  –
 LIDAR –

Soil/porous media
 Bulk density & porosity
 Oven dried sample –
 Matric potential
 Suction plate – determines relationship between the water volume and matric potential
 Resistance thermometer – relates to matric potential from previous calibration
 Hydraulic conductivity
 Disc permeameter – measures soil hydraulic conductivity
 Rainfall simulator – measures output through the application of constant input ("rain") in a sealed area
 Slug test – addition or removal of water and monitors the time until return to predisturbance level
 Piezometer –
 Soil moisture content (water volume percentage)
 Frequency domain sensor –
 Time domain reflectometer –
 Neutron probe –

Water quality
 Conductivity
 Electrical conductivity – variety of probes used
 pH
 pH meter –
 Dissolved oxygen (DO)
 Winkler test –
 Turbidity
 Nephelometer (Turbidimeter) –
 Water clarity
 Secchi disk –
 Bed load
 Erosion/deposition

Modeling
 Behavioral modeling in hydrology

Equations
Basin
 Hack's law –
Catchment
 Water balance –
Evaporation
 Penman –
 Penman-Monteith –
Infiltration/Soil Movement
 Darcy's Law –
 Darcy-Weisbach –
 Richards equation –
Streamflow/Open channel
 Fick's law of diffusion –
 Chézy formula –
 Manning formula –
 Strahler number –
 Standard step method – computational technique for modeling steady state open channel surface profiles
Erosion
 Hjulström curve –
Groundwater
 Dupuit–Forchheimer assumption –
 Groundwater flow equation –

Power/Uncertainty
 Nash–Sutcliffe model efficiency coefficient
 GLUE

Models

Hydrological transport model

 Canadian Land Surface Scheme
 CHyM – Cetemps Hydrological Model
 DRAINMOD
 DSSAM
 FEHM
 Flood Modeller Pro
 Groundwater model
 GSSHA
 HBV hydrology model
 HEC-HMS
 HydroGeoSphere
 Hydrologic evaluation of landfill performance
 Hydrological transport model
 Isochrone map
 Litpack
 METRIC
 MIKE 11
 MODFLOW
 Mouse
 RheinBlick2050
 Runoff model (reservoir)
 SahysMod
 SaltMod
 SEDCAD
 SHETRAN
 Stochastic Empirical Loading and Dilution Model
 SWAT model
 Temporal Analyst
 Vflo
 WAFLEX
 WaterGAP
 WEAP
 ZOOMQ3D

Applications of hydrology 

Some examples of applications of hydrology:
 Analyzing the impacts of antecedent moisture on sanitary sewer systems
 Assessing contaminant transport risk and establishing environmental policy guidelines
 Assessing the impacts of natural and anthropogenic environmental change on water resources
 Designing bridges
 Designing dams for water supply or hydroelectric power generation
 Designing irrigation schemes and managing agricultural productivity
 Designing riparian restoration projects
 Designing sewers and urban drainage system
 Determining the agricultural water balance
 Determining the water balance of a region
 Fog collection
 Part of the hazard module in catastrophe modeling
 Predicting and mitigating flood, landslide and drought risk
 Predicting geomorphologic changes, such as erosion or sedimentation
 Providing drinking water
 Real-time flood forecasting and flood warning

Hydrology organizations

Intergovernmental organizations 

 International Hydrological Programme (IHP)

International research bodies 

 International Water Management Institute (IWMI)
 UNESCO-IHE Institute for Water Education

National research bodies 

 Centre for Ecology and Hydrology – UK
 Centre for Water Science, Cranfield University, UK
 eawag – aquatic research, ETH Zürich, Switzerland
 Institute of Hydrology, Albert-Ludwigs-University of Freiburg, Germany
 United States Geological Survey – Water Resources of the United States
 NOAA's National Weather Service – Office of Hydrologic Development, USA
 US Army Corps of Engineers Hydrologic Engineering Center, USA
 Hydrologic Research Center, USA
 NOAA Economics and Social Sciences, USA
 University of Oklahoma Center for Natural Hazards and Disasters Research, USA
 National Hydrology Research Centre, Canada
 National Institute of Hydrology, India

National and international societies 
 Geological Society of America (GSA) – Hydrogeology Division
 American Geophysical Union (AGU) – Hydrology Section
 National Ground Water Association (NGWA)
 American Water Resources Association
 Consortium of Universities for the Advancement of Hydrologic Science, Inc. (CUAHSI)
 International Association of Hydrological Sciences (IAHS)
 Statistics in Hydrology Working Group (subgroup of IAHS)
 German Hydrological Society (DHG: Deutsche Hydrologische Gesellschaft)
 Italian Hydrological Society (SII-IHS) – http://www.sii-ihs.it
 Nordic Association for Hydrology
 British Hydrological Society
 Russian Geographical Society (Moscow Center) – Hydrology Commission
 International Association for Environmental Hydrology
 International Association of Hydrogeologists

Basin- and catchment-wide overviews 
 Connected Waters Initiative, University of New South Wales – Investigating and raising awareness of groundwater and water resource issues in Australia
 Murray Darling Basin Initiative, Department of Environment and Heritage, Australia

Hydrology publications

Hydrology-related journals 

 Hydrological Processes,  (electronic) 0885-6087 (paper), John Wiley & Sons
 Hydrology Research, IWA Publishing  (formerly Nordic Hydrology)
 Journal of Hydroinformatics, IWA Publishing
 Journal of Hydrologic Engineering, ASCE Publication
 Journal of Hydrology
 Water Research
 Water Resources Research
 Hydrological Sciences Journal  – Journal of the International Association of Hydrological Sciences (IAHS)  (Print),  (Online)

Persons influential in the field of hydrology 

 Hein de Baar
 Günter Blöschl
 Chen Xing (hydrologist)
 Ven Te Chow
 Gedeon Dagan
 James Dooge
 Endre Dudich
 G. H. Dury
 Saeid Eslamian
 Philipp Forchheimer
 François-Alphonse Forel
 Pieter Harting
 Majid Hassanizadeh
 Alf Howard
 Jan Vladimír Hráský
 Hydra (skater)
 Shahbaz Khan (hydrologist)
 Vit Klemes
 Michal Kravčík
 Torben Larsen
 John R. Philip
 Giovanni Roncagli
 Arturo Sanchez-Azofeifa
 Alireza Shokoohi
 Bojidar Spiriev
 Valeryan Uryvaev
 Jasper A. Vrugt
 John Williams (water scientist)

 Czesław Zakaszewski

Allied sciences
Aquatic chemistry –
Civil engineering –
Hydraulic engineering –
Climatology –
Environmental engineering –
Environmental Engineering Science –
Geomorphology –
Hydroacoustics –
Hydrography –
Limnology –
Oceanography –
Physical geography –

Hydrology lists
Drainage basins by area – largest hydrologically defined watersheds in the world
 Floods – chronological and geographic list of major floods worldwide
Waterways – worldwide listing of waterbodies classified as rivers, canals, estuaries, and firths

See also 
 Outline of meteorology

 Other water-related fields
 Oceanography – more general study of water in the oceans and estuaries.
 Meteorology – more general study of the atmosphere and of weather, including precipitation as snow and rainfall.
 Limnology – study of inland waters (running and standing waters, both fresh and saline, natural or man-made), including their biological, chemical, physical, geological, and other attributes. This includes the study of lakes and ponds, rivers, springs, streams and wetlands.
 Water resources – sources of water that are useful or potentially useful. Hydrology studies the availability of those resources, but usually not their uses.

References

External links 

 Hydrology.nl – Portal to international hydrology and water resources
 Decision tree to choose an uncertainty method for hydrological and hydraulic modelling
 Experimental Hydrology Wiki

Hydrology
Hydrology